Mars Ravelo's Darna! Ang Pagbabalik, or simply Darna! Ang Pagbabalik, is a 1994 Filipino superhero film based on the Pilipino Komiks character Darna. Directed by Peque Gallaga and Lore Reyes from a screenplay by playwright Floy Quintos, it stars Anjanette Abayari as Narda / Darna, alongside Edu Manzano, BB Gandanghari (credited as Rustom Padilla), Bong Alvarez, Pilita Corrales, Cherie Gil and Lester Llansang. Produced by Viva Family Entertainment, the film was released in June 9, 1994.

As of 2023, it is the last Darna film to be released in theaters, with studios opting instead to produce television shows for the character of Darna in later years.

Cast

Anjanette Abayari as Narda / Darna
Edu Manzano as Max
Rustom Padilla as Pol
Bong Alvarez as Magnum
Pilita Corrales as Valentina
Cherie Gil as Valentine, daughter of Valentina
Lester Llansang as Ding
Ai Ai delas Alas
Eva Ramos as L300 noisy mother
Pen Medina as barangay captain
Jemanine Campanilla as Pia
Romy Romulo as Valentine's driver
Jun Achaval as a pilot
Dwight Gaston as a pilot
Jinky Laurel as bank teller
Chiqui Xeres Burgos as governor
Bong Regala as army lieutenant

Production
Anjanette Abayari was cast for the role of Darna after she appeared in an automobile commercial dressed as the character alongside Alma Concepcion and Daisy Romualdez. The film is director Erik Matti's first production in the local film industry, serving as the continuity supervisor.

Home media
Darna! Ang Pagbabalik was released on DVD in Hong Kong by My Way Film Co. on September 27, 2002. The film is currently made available for streaming by Viva Communications on Vivamax.

References

External links

1994 films
Darna
1990s action films
1990s superhero films
1990s fantasy films
Filipino-language films
Films directed by Peque Gallaga
Philippine action films
Philippine fantasy films
Philippine superhero films
Viva Films films